JUDO is a Java-based integrated development environment designed for children and beginning computer programmers. It is licensed under the GNU GPL.

Syntax
When you compile a program in JUDO, it works by inserting the user's code into a .java file with code that controls the window, listens for keystrokes, and handles MouseEvents. This means that JUDO code is actually Java code, just with an easier to use subset of functions that access the Java API.
   void main() {
      
      printLine("Hello World!");
   
   }

This program will print out "Hello World".

External links
JUDO's Website

A detailed tutorial on how to use JUDO.

Integrated development environments
Free integrated development environments
Pedagogic integrated development environments